Åström is a surname of Swedish origin. Notable people with the surname include:

Alice Åström (born 1959), Swedish politician
Anna Åström (born 1990), Swedish actress
Emma Irene Åström (1847–1934), Finnish teacher
Erik Åström (1902–1971), Finnish sprinter
Gertrud Åström (born 1954), Swedish businesswoman
Gunnar Åström (1904–1952), Finnish football player
Hans Åström (born 1968), Swedish bandy player
Hardy Åström (born 1951), Swedish ice hockey goaltender
Henrik Åström (born 1980), Swedish composer and music producer
Hjalmar Åström (1888–1957), Swedish lieutenant general
Karin Åström (born 1953), Swedish politician
Karl-Erik Åström (born 1924), Swedish cross-country skier
Karl Johan Åström (born 1934), Swedish control theorist
Kristofer Åström, Swedish singer-songwriter
Maja Åström (born 1982), Swedish football player
Nina Åström (born 1962), Finnish singer-songwriter
Patrik Åström (born 1987), Swedish football player
Paul Åström (1929–2008), Swedish archaeologist
Peer Åström (born 1972), Swedish songwriter
Sverker Åström (1915–2012), Swedish diplomat
Ted Åström (born 1945), Swedish actor

Swedish-language surnames